The 10th Australian Recording Industry Association Music Awards (generally known as the ARIA Music Awards or simply The ARIAS) was held on 30 September 1996 at the Sydney Convention and Exhibition Centre. Presenters distributed 28 awards with the big winner for the year was You Am I gaining six awards.

In addition to previous categories an Outstanding Achievement Award was presented to Silverchair, which acknowledged "[their] conquering world charts with the single 'Tomorrow' and the debut album album frogstomp." A Special Achievement Award was presented to Slim Dusty. The ARIA Hall of Fame inducted: Australian Crawl and Horrie Dargie. Australian Crawl's founding guitarist Brad Robinson, was unable to attend; he was hospitalised with lymphoma (diagnosed three years earlier) and died two weeks after the ceremony. It was also the final Australian performance by INXS with original frontman Michael Hutchence before his death 14 months later.

Ceremony details

Australian music journalist, Anthony O'Grady, observed, "It was the last of the Bigger-Than-Ben-Hur Award nights (for the foreseeable future). Over 4,000 (the largest crowd ever and 8 times the number at the first Awards) flooded into the [venue]... [with a] repast at over 200 tables supplied by a dozen kitchens." Deni Hines won a trophy for Breakthrough Artist – Single for "It's Alright". Her entire acceptance speech was:

Presenters and performers 

The ARIA Awards ceremony was hosted by American musicians Harry Connick Jr. and Chris Isaak. Presenters and performers were:

Awards

Final nominees for awards are shown in plain, with winners in bold.

ARIA Awards

Album of the Year 
You Am I – Hourly, Daily
Nick Cave and the Bad Seeds – Murder Ballads
John Farnham – Romeo's Heart
Finn – Finn
Regurgitator – Tu-Plang
Single of the Year 
Nick Cave & Kylie Minogue – "Where the Wild Roses Grow"
Ammonia – "Drugs"
Tina Arena – "Wasn't It Good"
Powderfinger – "Pick You Up"
You Am I – "Mr. Milk"
Highest Selling Album 
Tina Arena – Don't Ask
John Williamson – True Blue – The Very Best of John Williamson
Martin/Molloy – The Brown Album
Merril Bainbridge – The Garden
Max Sharam – A Million Year Girl

Highest Selling Single
CDB – "Let's Groove"
Crowded House – "Everything Is Good for You"
Merril Bainbridge – "Under the Water"
Peter Andre – "Mysterious Girl"
Regurgitator – New (EP)

Best Group
You Am I – Hourly, Daily
The Badloves – Holy Roadside
Crowded House – "Everything Is Good for You"
Regurgitator – Tu-Plang
Silverchair – "Blind"
Best Female Artist
Christine Anu – "Come On"
Tina Arena – "Wasn't It Good"
Kate Ceberano – "Change"
Deni Hines – Imagination
Max Sharam – "Is it OK" / "Huntinground"
Best Male Artist
Dave Graney – The Soft 'N Sexy Sound
Diesel – Short Cool Ones
John Farnham – Romeo's Heart
Paul Kelly – Deeper Water
Tex Perkins – "You're Too Beautiful"
Best New Talent 
Monique Brumby – "Fool for You"
Human Nature – "Got It Goin' On"
Fiona Kernaghan – Cypress Grove
Rail – Bad Hair Life
Ute – Under the External
Breakthrough Artist – Album
Regurgitator – Tu-Plang
Ammonia – Mint 400
Merril Bainbridge – The Garden
Deni Hines – Imagination
Pollyanna – Long Player
Breakthrough Artist – Single
Deni Hines – "It's Alright"
Monique Brumby – "Fool for You"
Nikka Costa – "Master Blaster"
Rail – "Immune Deficiency"
Savage Garden – "I Want You"
Best Dance Release
Future Sound of Melbourne – Chapter One
DJ Darren (Darren Briais) & DJ Pee Wee – "I Feel It"
Infusion – Smoke ScreenItch-E and Scratch-E – "Howling Dog"
Renegade Funktrain – Renegade Funktrain
Best Pop Release Nick Cave & Kylie Minogue – "Where the Wild Roses Grow"Christine Anu – "Come On"
Tina Arena – "Wasn't It Good"
Hoodoo Gurus – Blue Cave
Swoop – The Woxo Principle
Best Country AlbumDead Ringer Band – Home FiresGraeme Connors – The Here and Now
Lee Kernaghan – 1959
Tania Kernaghan – December Moon
The Wheel – The Wheel
Best Independent Release You Am I – Hourly, DailyCustard – Wisenheimer
Ed Kuepper – The Exotic Mail Order Moods of Ed Kuepper
TISM – "Greg! The Stop Sign!!"
Underground Lovers – Rushall Station
Best Alternative Release Regurgitator – Tu-PlangNick Cave and the Bad Seeds – Murder Ballads
Pollyanna – Long Player
Spiderbait – The Unfinished Spanish Galleon of Finley Lake
You Am I – Hourly, Daily
Best Indigenous Release Christine Anu – "Come On"Kev Carmody – Images and Illusions
Blekbala Mujik – Blekbala Mujik
Various – Our Home, Our Land
Warumpi Band – Too Much Humbug
Best Adult Contemporary Album John Farnham – Romeo's HeartKate Ceberano – "Change"
Stephen Cummings – Escapist
Tommy Emmanuel – Classical Gas
Mick Harvey – Intoxicated Man
Best Comedy Release Martin/Molloy – The Brown AlbumAusten Tayshus – I'm Jacques Chirac
Bucko & Champs – Aussie Christmas
Silverpram – Frogstamp
The Vaughans – "Who Farted?"

Fine Arts Awards
Best Jazz Album Paul Grabowsky Trio – When Words FailBob Barnard – Live at the Sydney Opera House
Bob Bertles Quintet – Rhythm of the Heart
The Engine Room – Full Steam Ahead
Barney McCall – Exit
Best Classical Album Australian Chamber Orchestra – Peter Sculthorpe: Music for StringsAustralian Chamber Orchestra – Spirit
Australia Ensemble – Shostakovich
Macquarie Trio – Beethoven Piano Trios
Marshall McGuire – Awakening
Best Children's Album The Wiggles – Wake Up Jeff!Bananas in Pyjamas – It's Singing Time!
Christine Hutchinson – Grand Fairies Ball
Gillian Eastoe – Extra Awesome Intergalactical Expedition
Peter Combe – Little Groover
Best Original Soundtrack / Cast / Show Recording Australian Cast Recording – Beauty & the BeastAustralian Cast Recording – The Secret Garden
Iva Davies – The Berlin Tapes
Cezary Skubiszewski – Lilian's Story
Nigel Westlake – Babe
Best World Music AlbumMara! – Rulno VlnoCafe of the Gate of Salvation – A Window in Heaven
Dead Can Dance – Spiritchaser
Sirocco – Stars and Fires
Various – Womadelaide '95

Artisan Awards
Song of the YearNick Cave & Kylie Minogue – "Where the Wild Roses Grow"Tina Arena – "Wasn't It Good"
Tim Finn & Neil Finn – "Suffer Never"
Powderfinger – "Pick You Up"
Swoop – "Apple Eyes"
Producer of the YearYou Am I – You Am I – Hourly, DailyDavid Bridie – Monique Brumby – Fool for You
The Badloves, Doug Roberts – The Badloves – Holy Roadside
Magoo, Regurgitator – Regurgitator – Tu-Plang
Victor Vaughan – Dave Graney & the Coral Snakes – The Soft 'N Sexy Sound
Engineer of the Year Paul McKercher, Wayne Connolly – You Am I – Hourly, DailyDoug Brady – John Farnham – Romeo's Heart
Chris Dickie - Six Mile High - "Homebaker", "Hallowed ground" / Header - "Restoration"
Magoo – Regurgitator – Tu-Plang
Tom Whitten – Powderfinger - "Pick You Up" / Automatic - Sister K / Bluebottle Kiss - Double Yellow Tarred
Best Video Andrew Lancaster – You Am I – "Soldiers"Robbie Douglas-Turner – The Cruel Sea – "Too Fast for Me"
John Fransic – Swoop – "Apple Eyes"
John Hillcoat, Polly Borland – Frente! – "Sit on My Hands"
John Witteron – Hoodoo Gurus – "Waking up Tired"
Best Cover Art Reg Mombassa – Mental As Anything – Liar Liar Pants on FireSimon Anderson – You Am I – Hourly, Daily
Rockin' Doodles, Quan Yeomans, Ben Ely – Regurgitator – Tu-Plang
Janet English, George Stajsic – Spiderbait – The Unfinished Spanish Galleon of Finley Lake
Tony Mahoney – Dave Graney – The Soft 'N Sexy Sound

Achievement awards

Outstanding Achievement AwardSilverchairSpecial Achievement AwardSlim DustyARIA Hall of Fame inductees
The Hall of Fame inductees were:Australian CrawlHorrie Dargie'''

Notes

References

External links
ARIA Awards official website
List of 1996 winners

1996 music awards
1996 in Australian music
ARIA Music Awards